The Thalassery cuisine refers to the distinct cuisine from Thalassery town of northern Kerala, which has blended in Arabian, Persian, Indian and European styles of cooking as a result of its long history as a maritime trading post.

Thalassery is known for its Tellicherry biryani (in local dialect, biri-yaa-ni). Unlike other biryani dishes Thalassery biryani is made using kaima/jeerakasala, an Indian aromatic rice instead of the usual basmati rice.

Influences of Arabian and Moghul cultures are evident, especially in the dishes of the Muslim community, though they have also become popular generally.

Thalassery also occupies a special place in the modern history of Kerala as the pioneer of its bakery industry, since the first bakery was started by Mambally Bapu in 1880 and the Western-style cakes were introduced in 1883.

Malabar cuisine

There are broadly two classes of non-vegetarian cuisine in Kerala: Malabar cuisine, which is from North Kerala, and Syrian-Christian cuisine which is from the South (Travancore and Kochi regions).

The two are clearly distinct: the former has Mughlai-Arab, Portuguese, British, Dutch, and French influences and the latter includes a mix of Kerala traditional dishes rich in coconut, as well as various recipes of Syrian, Jewish, Dutch, Portuguese and British origin.

Most dishes of Malabar cuisine, including Thalassery biryani, involve frying in ghee.

There are sweet and spicy variants and they are predominantly non-vegetarian. The sweeteners are mostly used as snacks to be consumed in the afternoon or early evening.
Biryani was introduced into the region due to Islamic influence and the recipe gradually evolved into Thalassery biryani. Biryani is traditionally seen only as an occasional serving and not as staple food.

Thalassery Faloodha

Thalassery faloodha is a regional variant of the Persian dessert. This is a cocktail of fruit salad, dry fruits such as blackcurrant, pistachio, cashew, almond (badam), rose milk and vanilla ice cream.

Green mussel dishes
The Asian green mussel (Perna viridis) cuisines are favored in Thalassery dishes. 
They grow on rocks at the seashore.

Other dishes include kallummakaya porichathu (fried mussel),  (stuffed-in-shell mussel, steamed and fried), kallumakkaya ularthiyath (mussel stir-fry), kallumakkaya varattiyathu (mussel pickles). Elambakka (clams) are also popular. 

The green mussels' popularity led farmers to employ aquaculture in local rivers to increase supplies. Thalassery natives are known for their generous hospitality towards guests.

Thalassery Snacks
Another Thalassery dish is kozhi-kkalu, made with sliced tapioca. 

Muttamala and muttasirka are traditional sweets made using egg, where muttamala is yellow noodle-like made of egg-yolk and muttasirka is white-colored, made of egg whites. Typically, muttamala is spread over pieces of muttasirka, and they are further adorned with cherries.

Unnakkai (ഉന്നക്കായ്‌) also known as unnakaya, unnakka, kaai ada, and kaai porichathu, is a spindle-shaped sweet dessert made of plantains. It is a famous Malabar snack often served at weddings, Iftar parties and other festivities.
It is prepared by stuffing plantain with flavored coconut (and optionally with egg) and fried in ghee.

Chatti pathiri is similar to lasagne where layers of spiced (masala) beef or chicken mixture are placed between layers of egg-dipped pancakes and baked in oven. It is especially served in Malabar Muslim weddings and reception parties.

Thalassery Biryani
Thalassery biryani is a rice-based dish blended with spices and chicken. As it is the only biryani recipe in Kerala cuisine, it can also be called Kerala biryani. Thalassery biryani is the only type of biryani in the whole of Kerala which uses Kaima rice for preparation.

The main difference between Thalassery biryani and other biryanis is that it uses only Khaima/Jeerakasala ricea short-grain, thin rice which is also called biryani rice in Kerala. The dish does not use basmati rice.

Biryani is an exotic dish of Mughal origin, but this variant is an indigenous recipe of Malabar. It is a symbol of the cultural amalgamation of Mughal and Malabari cuisines. The Mughals brought the cuisine of biryani from Samarkand, and later variations of biryani developed in different parts of India.

Thalassery biryani may have come to the region because of the influence of the Muslim rulers of Mysore and Arkot.

Thalassery biryani is a cultural embodiment and is reminiscent of foreign influences in Malabar; it is a reminder of the Mughal-Arab cultural influence in North Kerala due to the trade that lasted for many centuries before the 1900s and the emigration to the Middle East of locals from the 1970s onwards. Thalassery sea port was an export trade centre for spices where a convergence of European, Arab and Malabar cultures occurred.

Etymology
The name "Thalassery biryani" originates from Thalassery, a town in the coastal Malabar region in North Kerala, India.  The word "biryani" is derived from the Persian word biryān (n) which means "fried" or "roasted". Biryani was believed to have been invented in the kitchens of the Mughal Emperors; Thalassery biryani is one of many ways of preparing biryani dishes. In the local dialect-Malayalam, there is a small variation in pronunciation. It is called "biri-yaa-ni" instead of "bir-yani".

Historical and cultural influences
Thalassery biryani is an strong indication of Islamic cultural influence in the region. The dish is traditional Mappila (Malabar Muslims) or Malabar cuisine. Ancient written records, except in a few treatises by historians, citing the origin of Mappilas are rare.

The stories about the conversion of the last Chera Emperor Cheraman Perumal (Rama Varma Kulasekhara Perumal) to Islam from Mahodayapuram (Kodungallur) by Malik Deenar and the subsequent conversion of Perumal's sister and nephew residing in Dharmadam (a village located north of Thalassery) are generally believed to be the origin of Islam in North Malabar.

Perumal is believed to have left Kerala from an erstwhile feudal province in the region named Poyanad (Poya Nadu, "The province from whence he left") which lies in between the Thalassery and Kannur taluks (governed by local chieftains named Randuthara Achanmar before 1947).

Perumal's nephew Mahabali, is believed to be the first Ali Raja of the Arakkal kingdom (the Sultanate of Lakshadweep and Cannanore), the sole Muslim kingdom of Kerala. The Arakkal kingdom controlled Dharmadam until the formation of Kerala state on 1 November 1956.

The legend shows that these incidents had a significant impact in the introduction of Islamic culture to Thalassery.

In the ancient times, Thalasseryan erstwhile seaport in North Malabarwas geographically in the convergence point of three regional provinces, Chirakkal, Kottayam and Kadathanad. It was also the end point of the "Perya pass" coming from the eastern hilly areas of Coorg and Wayanad making it an important trade center of spices in Malabar.

Arab traders, Arkot rulers and the invasion of Sultanate of Mysore were other important factors which introduced and developed various Islamic culture in the region.

During the Muslim holy month of Ramzan, Malabar dishes are made in abundant varieties. The Muslim community of Malabar differs culturally; the lifestyle of the trader communities near the coastal towns differs from that of the farming communities in the inland and hilly areas.

Malabar cuisine varies throughout the region. In the modern era as communication improved exponentially, the differences of culture between coastal and hilly area became inconspicuous resulting in the amalgamation of food culture within the Muslim community in Malabar .

The Mughlai cuisine had a significant influence upon Malabar recipes. Mughali recipes including biryani, kebab and naan spread throughout India. The ingredients included rice, maida, wheat and there was extensive use of ghee (clarified butter) and oils for preparation. Sweet delicacies were made from jaggery (unrefined sugar).

Most of these dishes are non-vegetarian; chicken, mutton, lamb and beef are used but pork is not consumed due to religious regulations. Dishes range from mild to extremely spicy, and the dishes have distinct aromas.

In Islamic food culture non-vegetarian dishes must be halal-compliant, as required for Muslims by religious directive. Malabar Mappila dishes are preferred by some societies to be compliant with the halal method of food processing.

Differences from other biryani

This rice, even though small in size, is different from the common small rice used in many Indian rice dishes.

Kaima/jeerakasala is not round, unlike other common smaller variants, and its fragrance is another distinct feature.  Other kinds of rice that could be used are jeera rice, jeerakasemba or small Bangladeshi biryani rice.

The rice is white, short (small) grained, thin (not plump), but it is the aroma of these rice varieties which make then distinctive. 
The recipes and cuisine of Thalassery biryani have clear differences from other biryani variants.

Kaima/jeerakasala rice does not need pre-soaking, water is only used to clean it. After adequate boiling no water should remain in the cooking dish as it should have been evaporated completely. This is a major difference from other rice preparation, in which water has to be drained off after cooking.

Ghee rice is blended with masala using the dum process (a method of cooking by sealing a lid tightly and placing hot charcoal on it). The biryani masala and ghee rice are arranged in layers inside the dish. Meat is cooked with masala on slow fire; it is layered with rice and the lid of the container is sealed with maida dough or a loin cloth. Hot coal or charcoal is placed then above the lid.

Thalassery biryani is a Pakki biryani. There are two types of biryani, "Pakki" and "Kacchi". In Pakki style, the ghee rice is added to the fully cooked chicken-masala mix and then cooked by the dum process, whereas in Kacchi style the ghee rice is added to the half-cooked chicken and then cooked till it is fully cooked or the dum process is used.

Specially dressed chicken is poured into the masala dish. The chicken is slowly cooked in the masala, and gets blended well with the juices of masala and spices.

The Thalassery biryani recipe has additional distinct features; unlike other biryanis it is not oily because of the dum process used for preparation. A unique blend of spices is added and the kaima rice also adds a unique flavour. No oil is used to make the chicken, which is added raw into the masala mix.

Ingredients
For the recipe, see 

Khaima (jeerakasala) rice
Chicken
Onion
Ginger
Garlic
Green chilli
Lime juice
Shallot
Coriander leaves
Mint leaves
Tomato 
Ghee
Hydrogenated vegetable oil (vanaspati)
Coconut oil
 Edible rose water
Curd or yoghurt
Table salt
Spices: Garam masala powder, Persian cumin (caraway), mace, turmeric powder, red chili powder, black pepper powder, crushed curry leaves (optional) cinnamon, cloves, cardamom, Malabar leaf (Indian bay leaf), Indian white poppy seed (kaskas) and for garnishing and texture saffron soaked in milk, pinch of artificial food colour, yellow or orange; and fried (coconut oil) mix of onion, cashew nuts and kismis (sultana raisins), star anise (optional).

Accompaniments
 

Common side dishes served with Thalassery biryani are coconut-mint chammandi (biryani chutney), South Asian pickle and raita. After the meal, hot lime-black tea (known among the Muslim community as sulaimani) is served; this adds a special taste after the main course and is an aid to digestion.  Lime tea is a common "afters" in the Malabar region, especially with a rice-based main course.

Fried Indian anchovy or smelt can be served as a starter if required and this is garnished with chopped onion, curry leaves and lime juice squeezed over it. Fried chicken in smaller pieces is also seen in some fiestas as accompaniments or as starters.

Daahashamani water, a medicated herbal water, is preferred to be used when drinking water with biryani. Daahashamani is an ayurvedic medicine and natural thirst reliever and digestive aid prepared by mixing dry ginger, cardamom, cloves, coriander seeds, mimosa catechu, sapanwood, vetiver, puncturevine and sandal wood, it is usually available in local markets.

Popularity

Thalassery biryani is popular and is often served in Malabar in weddings and other celebrations and parties, and is an unavoidable dish for the Muslim community.

Even though sadya is the traditional cuisine for Hindu weddings in the region, some Hindus and Christians often serve biryani, mainly because it is easier to prepare than other main course dishes and is a complete food that avoids the extra effort of making curry.

Nutrition
Thalassery biryani is rich in nutrients as it is a rice-spice dish. It is high in proteins and carbohydrates, and is also a source of minerals and vitamins. Nutritional value (according to U.S Dept. of Agriculture) of the spices is mentioned in the notes.

The dish contains unsaturated and saturated fats; the amount of saturated fat can be reduced by adjusting the quantities of hydrogenated vegetable oil (vanaspati) and ghee.

In fiction
The Malayalam movie Ustad Hotel is based on the preparation of Malabar biryani. The film is about a restaurant that specialises in Malabar cuisines made without adulteration and based on traditional recipes. The film shows customers choosing the restaurant for its authentic dishes.

The fictional restaurant depicted in the film is a prominent destination for food lovers as the cuisine is based on genuine Malabar cuisine. The restaurant serves their flagship dish—Thalassery biryani—to all customers who come there for the first time, so admiring the dish that whenever they come back to the city they choose this restaurant and order it again.

The film shows the importance of fiesta in Malabar culture. Making the uniqueness of Malabar biryani the theme of a blockbuster film shows how important the dish is in the Malabar region and throughout Kerala.

See also

 Biryani
 Thalassery
 Cuisine of Kerala
 South Indian cuisine
 List of rice dishes

Notes and references

Notes
Name of ingredients and their corresponding nutritional value (Link to this is given as highlighted superscript). Data reference: Nutrient Data Laboratory, United States Department of Agriculture-Agricultural Research Service. Items marked in asterisk (*) are optional ingredients.

References

Bibliography of notable references

Further reading
Malabar biryani: 
Hyderabadi biryani: 
Basmati Chicken biryani:

External links

 

Indian rice dishes
South Indian cuisine
Kerala cuisine
Indian chicken dishes
South Asian cuisine
Thalassery
Culture of Kannur district